C. Nelson Day (June 30, 1915 – November 17, 1974) was an American attorney who served as the United States Attorney for the District of Utah from 1969 to 1974.

He died in a car accident on November 17, 1974, in Mona, Utah at age 59.

References

1915 births
1974 deaths
United States Attorneys for the District of Utah
Utah Republicans